Elpidia is a genus of deep-sea sea cucumbers. Members are characterised by their rod-shaped spicules which each have two pairs of obliquely-placed horizontal arms and two vertical apophyses. There is a high degree of endemism in this genus with different species occupying different deep sea basins or regions.

Species
The following species are recognised in the genus Elpidia:

Elpidia adenensis Belyaev, 1971
Elpidia antarctica Belyaev, 1971
Elpidia atakama Belyaev, 1971
Elpidia belyaevi Rogacheva, 2007
Elpidia birsteini Belyaev, 1971
Elpidia chilensis Belyaev, 1971
Elpidia decapoda Belyaev, 1975
Elpidia echinata (R. Perrier, 1896)
Elpidia glacialis Théel, 1876
Elpidia gracilis Belyaev, 1975
Elpidia heckeri Baranova, 1989
Elpidia javanica Belyaev, 1971
Elpidia kermadecensis Hansen, 1956
Elpidia kurilensis Baranova & Belyaev in Belyaev, 1971
Elpidia lata Belyaev, 1975
Elpidia longicirrata Belyaev, 1971
Elpidia minutissima Belyaev, 1971
Elpidia ninae Belyaev, 1975
Elpidia solomonensis Hansen, 1956
Elpidia soyoae Ogawa, Morita & Fujita, 2020
Elpidia sundensis Hansen, 1956
Elpidia theeli Hansen, 1956
Elpidia uschakovi Belyaev, 1971

References

Holothuroidea genera
Elpidiidae
Taxa named by Johan Hjalmar Théel